The following list of people play, or have played, significant roles in the World Rally Championship (WRC):

FIA WRC Commission (2022-2023)

Administration
 Jean-Marie Balestre – president of the FISA (1979–1991) and the president of the FIA (1986–1993)
 Alfredo César Torres – vice-president of the FISA (1979–1993) and the vice-president of the FIA (1988–1993) and the sport deputy president of the FIA (1993–1997) and the president of the ACP (1980–1997) 
 Morrie Chandler – appointed president of the FIA's World Rally Championship commission in July 2006 and left 2010
 Oliver Ciesla - Former WRC Promoter Managing Director 
 Nazir Hoosein – chief steward of the World Rally Championship
 Yves Matton - former FIA Rally Director
 Max Mosley – president of the FIA (1993–2009)
 Shekhar Mehta – president of the WRC commission, from March 2006 to 12 April 2006 when he died unexpectedly.
 Jacques Regis – president of the WRC commission until March 2006
 Jona Siebel - WRC Promoter CEO (2021–)
 Mohammed bin Sulayem - president of the FIA (2021–), fourteen times champion of Middle East Rally Championship 
 Jean Todt – president of the FIA (2009–2021)
 Andrew Wheatley - FIA Rally Director (2021–), former Sporting Delegate

Team management

 Andrea Adamo – team principal of the Hyundai Motorsport (2019–)
 Ove Andersson – former driver, founder and long-time head of Toyota Team Europe
 Peter Ashcroft – former team manager of the Ford Motorsport (1986–1991)
 Marc van Dalen – former team principal of the Kronos Citroën (2006)
 Raimund Baumschlager – former driver, former team principal of the Red Bull Škoda (2006)
 Jacky Bozian – former director of the Bozian Racing
 Pierre Budar – team principal of the Citroën Racing (2018–) 
 Jost Capito – former director of the Ford Motorsport (2003–2007) and the Volkswagen Motorsport (2012–2016)
 Xavier Carlotti – former team manager of the Peugeot Sport (1999–2002)
 Aime Chatard – rally programme manager of Michelin (1993–2005) and BF Goodrich (2006)
 François Chatriot – former driver, former team manager for Citroën (2003–2004) and Peugeot (2002–2003)
 Andrew Cowan – former driver, founder and director of Ralliart, Mitsubishi's  motorsport division
 Derek Dauncey – former team manager of Mitsubishi
George Donaldson – former team manager at Mitsubishi and Toyota, and former sporting director at Subaru
 Pierre Dupasquier – former head of Michelin's competition department (1973–1984 and 1990–2005)
 Tony Fall – former driver, former team principal of the Rothmans Opel Team (1982)
 Guy Fréquelin – former driver, former director of the Citroën Sport (1989–2007)
 Pavel Janeba – former team manager of the Škoda Motorsport (1990–2003)
 David Lapworth – former team principal (2000–2006) and technical director (2007–2008) of the Subaru World Rally Team
 Jari-Matti Latvala – former driver and team principal of the Toyota Gazoo Racing WRT (2021–)
 Yves Matton – former team principal of the Citroën Racing (2012–2017)
 Rich Millener – team principal of the M-Sport World Rally Team (2019–)
 Tommi Mäkinen – former driver and former team principal of the Toyota Gazoo Racing WRT (2016–2020)
 Michel Nandan – former team principal of the Hyundai Motorsport (2013–2018)
 Jean-Pierre Nicolas – former driver, former sporting director of the Peugeot Sport
 Corrado Provera – former director of the Peugeot Sport (1998–2005)
 Olivier Quesnel – co-founder of the Peugeot Talbot Sport, former director of the Citroën Sport (2008–2012)
 Cesare Fiorio - Team Principal,Fiat Alitalia rally Team, and Martini Lancia rally team.
 David Richards – former co-driver, co-founder of Prodrive, former team principal of the Subaru World Rally Team
 Phil Short – former team manager of the Mitsubishi Ralliart (1995–2000)
 Sven Smeets – former co-driver, former team manager of the Citroën Sport (2008–2011) and Volkswagen Motorsport (2012–2016), director of the Volkswagen Motorsport
 Nobuhiro Tajima – former driver, former team principal of the Suzuki World Rally Team
 Jean Todt – former co-driver, founder of the Peugeot Talbot Sport
 David Whitehead – former team principal of the Hyundai World Rally Team (1998–2003)
 Malcolm Wilson – former driver, former team principal of the M-Sport World Rally Team (and defunct Ford World Rally Team)

Engineers
 Simon Carrier – chief designer of M-Sport
 Christophe Chapelain – chief designer of the Subaru World Rally Team (2006–)
 Didier Clement – chief engineer of the Citroën Sport (2015–)
 Nick Clipson – chief engineer of the Hyundai World Rally Team
 Philip Dunabin – chief engineer of the Ford Motorsport (1995–1996), engineer of the Ford Motorsport (1989–1994)
 Mario Fornaris – chief engineer of Mitsubishi Motors Motor Sports (2003–2005), test engineer of Peugeot Sport (1998–2002)
 Lasse Lampi – former driver, sporting and technical advisor of Mitsubishi Ralliart
 Christian Loriaux – chief engineer of M-Sport (2002–), engineer at Prodrive (1991–2002)
 Xavier Mestelan-Pinon – chief engineer of the Citroën Sport (2005–2014)
 Dietmar Metrich – chief engineer of the Škoda Motorsport (2001–2005), engineer of the Škoda Motorsport (1998–2000)
 Graham Moore – chief engineer of the Hyundai World Rally Team (2002–2003) and of the Subaru World Rally Team (2006–2008)
 Michel Nandan – technical director of Peugeot Sport (1999–2005) and technical manager of the Suzuki World Rally Team (2006–2007)
 Guenther Steiner – chief engineer of the Ford World Rally Team (1997–2001)
 Jean-Claude Vaucard – chief chassis engineer of Citroën Sport (1993–2005), chassis engineer at Peugeot Talbot Sport (1982–1993)

Rally officials
 Ian Campbell - FIA Steward
 Garry Connelly – clerk of the course of Rally Australia (1988–2002)
 Fred Gallagher – former co-driver, clerk of the course of Rally GB
 Seppo Harjanne – former co-driver, deputy clerk of the course of Rally Finland
 René Isoart – clerk of the course of Monte Carlo Rally
 Silver Kütt - FIA Steward
 Simo Lampinen – former driver, clerk of the course of Rally Finland
 Michèle Mouton - FIA Safety Delegate
 Timo Rautiainen - Former co-driver and FIA Sporting Delegate

Commentators and journalists

 Trevor Agnew - Absolute Rally podcast
Jim Bamber – cartoonist
 Luke Barry - Journalist, Dirtfish Media, Autosport and Motorsport News
Jack Benyon - Absolute Rally podcast
 Kiri Bloore - WRC TV/All Live presenter
 Ryan Champion - Absolute Rally podcast
 Mike Chen - Red Bull Rally TV presenter
 Colin Clark - Former WRC TV reporter and Dirtfish Media reporter
Ben Constanduros - WRC TV/All Live reporter
 John Davenport – former co-driver and author
 Jon Desborough - WRC TV/All Live commentator
 Hayley Edmonds - WRC TV/All Live reporter
 David Evans - Dirtfish Media journalist, formerly of Autosport and Motorsport News
 Robbie Head – former driver and commentator
 Martin Holmes – former co-driver, journalist and author
 Paul King - WRC TV/All Live commentator
 Sebastian Marshall - Co-driver and WRC TV/All Live reporter and commentator
 Luis Moya - Former Co-driver and frequent Red Bull Rally pundit
 Molly Pettit - WRC TV/All Live reporter
 Julian Porter - WRC TV/All Live commentator
Tony Simpson - Absolute Rally podcast host
 Becs Williams - WRC TV/All Live commentator, reporter, podcast and 'Meet the Crews' host
 Matthew Wilson - Frequent Red Bull Rally Pundit

Drivers

 Markku Alén – 1978 FIA Cup champion
 Didier Auriol – 1994 world champion
 Miki Biasion – 1988 and 1989 world champion
 Stig Blomqvist – 1984 world champion
 Richard Burns – 2001 world champion
 Marcus Grönholm – 2000 and 2002 world champion
 Juha Kankkunen – four-time world champion
 Sébastien Loeb – nine-time world champion, most successful rally driver
 Colin McRae – 1995 world champion, first British world champion
 Michèle Mouton – most successful female rally driver
 Tommi Mäkinen – four-time world champion
 Hannu Mikkola – 1983 world champion
 Sandro Munari – 1977 FIA Cup champion
 Sébastien Ogier – seven-time world champion
 Walter Röhrl – 1980 and 1982 world champion
 Carlos Sainz – 1990 and 1992 world champion
 Timo Salonen – 1985 world champion
 Petter Solberg – 2003 world champion
 Ott Tänak – 2019 world champion
 Ari Vatanen – 1981 world champion
 Björn Waldegård – 1979 world champion

Co-drivers

 Björn Cederberg – co-driver to Stig Blomqvist
 Daniel Elena – co-driver to Sébastien Loeb
 Fred Gallagher – co-driver to Henri Toivonen, Juha Kankkunen and Björn Waldegård
 Christian Geistdörfer – co-driver to Walter Röhrl and Hannu Mikkola
 Denis Giraudet – co-driver to Didier Auriol
 Nicky Grist – co-driver to Juha Kankkunen and Colin McRae
 Seppo Harjanne – co-driver to Timo Salonen and Tommi Mäkinen
 Arne Hertz – co-driver to Hannu Mikkola
 Julien Ingrassia – co-driver to Sébastien Ogier
 Martin Järveoja – co-driver to Ott Tänak
 Ilkka Kivimäki – co-driver to Markku Alén
 Risto Mannisenmäki – co-driver to Tommi Mäkinen
 Chris Patterson – co-driver to Petter Solberg
 Phil Mills – co-driver to Petter Solberg
 Luís Moya – co-driver to Carlos Sainz
 Michael Park – co-driver to Markko Märtin
 Juha Piironen – co-driver to Henri Toivonen and Juha Kankkunen
 Timo Rautiainen – co-driver to Marcus Grönholm
 Robert Reid – co-driver to Richard Burns
 Derek Ringer – co-driver to Colin McRae
 David Richards – co-driver to Ari Vatanen
 Tiziano Siviero – co-driver to Miki Biasion
 Hans Thorszelius – co-driver to Björn Waldegård
 Jean Todt – co-driver to Hannu Mikkola, Timo Mäkinen and Guy Fréquelin

References
 WRC people at juwra.com

 
People
World Rally Championship people